Marian apparitions are reported supernatural appearances by Mary, the mother of Jesus. Below is a list of alleged events concerning notable Marian apparitions, which have either been approved by a major Christian church, or which retain a significant following despite the absence of official approval or despite an official determination of inauthenticity. While a number of Marian apparitions are approved or received positive judgments, many receive no-decision or negative judgments from the church.

Catholic Church 

According to norms of the Catholic Church which have been in effect since the Council of Trent in the 16th century, the initial responsibility of evaluating the merits of any purported apparition falls to the bishop of the area in which the events allegedly occurred. If, after an investigation, the bishop determines that the apparition constitutes an authentic supernatural appearance of the Blessed Virgin Mary, then the apparition is considered approved for the entire Catholic Church, unless his successor or the Holy See were to contradict his decision.

Positive judgment 

The apparitions in this category have been judged to be "worthy of belief."

Approved, with widespread liturgical veneration endorsed by the Holy See 

A distinction is sometimes made between apparitions that are "Vatican approved" and those that are not. However, by the norms of Normae Congregationis, the only formal mechanisms for Holy See approval of an apparition would be the pope approving an apparition that had occurred in the Diocese of Rome, or the pope approving an apparition against the will of the local bishop, neither of which has happened to date. Even in cases in which the Congregation for the Doctrine of the Faith cooperates with an investigation that yields a positive result, the consequent approval derives its authority from the local bishop, not from the Holy See. Because approval by the Holy See can therefore only be claimed based on informal indicators of endorsement, lists of "Vatican-approved Marian apparitions" vary widely depending on the criteria used. The criterion used here is that the Holy See must have approved the widespread veneration of the apparition by inscribing it on a liturgical calendar besides that of the particular diocese in which the apparition occurred.

Approved 

Below is a list of additional apparitions which have been approved by the local ordinary (i.e. the bishop assigned to the area in which the events allegedly occurred).

Positive judgment of related effects 

In some cases, the apparitions do not receive a positive judgment in themselves (because an investigation is still in progress, or because an investigation is judged not to be feasible or necessary, etc.), but elements surrounding the apparition receive approval.

Approved contemporaneous miracle 

In cases in which a seer reports that Mary appeared to him or her and worked a miracle, ecclesial authorities will occasionally evaluate and certify the miracle – thereby implying belief in the person's account of how it happened – but without directly commenting on the apparition itself.

Approved public veneration 

There are cases in which the Holy See or a local ordinary chooses not to open or definitively conclude an investigation into the supernatural character of the apparitions themselves, but approves of the public religious activity inspired by the apparition. Such approval can come by way of an explicit decree or by implicit means such as the authorization of liturgical veneration.

Approved public pilgrimages 

For alleged apparitions in this category, public pilgrimages are permitted, but not public veneration.

No judgment 

Apparitions in this category have not received judgment on the apparitions themselves or on associated elements, either because an investigation was never opened, or because an investigation is still in progress.

Neutral judgment 

Apparitions in this category have been evaluated, but received neither approval nor rejection. This is known as a "non constat de supernaturalitate" judgment, or "non constat" for short. The apparitions listed here also lack approval for any related public cultus, such as public veneration or pilgrimages.

Negative judgment 

Some apparitions, despite being officially rejected, are notable for continuing to have a substantial following. In rare cases, rejected apparitions are approved at a later date once new evidence becomes available.

Coptic Orthodox Church

Notes

References

External links

 The Appeals of Our Lady, a compilation of apparitions researched by Carlo Acutis
 National Geographic: 500 Years of Virgin Mary Sightings in One Map
 The Miracle Hunter: Marian Apparitions

Marian apparitions
Catholic Mariology
Anglican Mariology
Christian miracles